Amrit Maan is an Indian singer, songwriter and actor associated with Punjabi film and music. He rose to fame after the release of his debut, Desi Da Drum in 2015. He is also known for his debut film Channa Mereya.

Early life
Maan was born in Goniana Mandi, Punjab, India. He did his master's degree in Technology in Software Engineering from Swami Vivekananda Institute of Engineering and Technology, Ramnagar, Mohali.

Career
Maan started his career in 2014 as a songwriter. His first song Jatt Fire Karda sung by Punjabi singer Diljit Dosanjh, was a big hit. He wrote many songs like Yaar Jundi de,. After getting success as a lyricist, he released his debut song Desi Da Drum. Other notable songs of Mann include Kaali Camaro, Bamb Jatt and Peg Di Washna.

Discography

Albums

Extended Plays

Singles discography

As lead artist

As featured artist

Songwriting discography

Filmography

Music videos

References

External links
 
 

Living people
People from Bathinda district
Male actors from Punjab, India
Singers from Punjab, India
Indian lyricists
21st-century Indian male actors
Year of birth missing (living people)